Youth Brigade is an American punk rock band formed in Hollywood, Los Angeles, California, in 1980 by the brothers Mark, Adam, and Shawn Stern. The band subsequently founded BYO (Better Youth Organization). Many later punk bands cite Youth Brigade as an influence, including The Nation of Ulysses and The Briefs.

Youth Brigade has released five studio albums (counting one released as The Brigade), of which the last was released in 1996. Almost each album was recorded with the original lineup of the Stern brothers (Mark, Adam and Shawn); bassist Bob Gnarly replaced Adam in 1985 during the recording of The Dividing Line, which was released as The Brigade. Adam returned in 1991 (when the band reunited) and contributed to the band's 1992 EP Come Again and their next two albums (Happy Hour and To Sell the Truth) before leaving once again in 2007. Youth Brigade continues to tour to this day, although, other than six new tracks on the 1999 split album BYO Split Series Volume II, they have not released a full-length studio album since To Sell the Truth in 1996.

History

Formation (1979–1981)
The Stern family, consisting of older brothers Shawn (guitar and vocals) and Mark (drums) and younger brother Adam (who would later play bass), moved from Toronto, Canada to Los Angeles in 1970, because their father worked in the film industry.  As teenagers, Shawn and Mark were surfers who would skip school to smoke marijuana and attend rock concerts. At 16 and 17, they played in their first band, called Mess, which would play Led Zeppelin and Jimi Hendrix covers at parties. A year later in 1978, they discovered punk rock, and formed a quirky prog/New Wave band called The Extremes, releasing a four-song EP in which Shawn would sing with a fake English accent.

In the fall of 1979, following a visit by touring British Oi! band Sham 69, the oldest two Stern brothers moved into a large house in Hollywood, California, near Hollywood High School, and christened "Skinhead Manor." The large punk house became a meeting place which drew participants from as far away as Huntington Beach and Oxnard. The site drew upon the creativity and energy of participants, with a small recording studio established, bands such as the Circle Jerks using Skinhead Manor as a practice space, and plans laid for the launch of a pirate radio station.

Skinhead Manor was also a place where people interested in forming punk bands could meet, and where the Sterns briefly created a swing band called the Swinging Skins (SS) Brigade, the precursor to Youth Brigade.  Additionally, the Manor served as a spawning ground for not only Youth Brigade in the summer of 1980, but also No Crisis and other bands. The use of drugs and alcohol were also, not surprisingly, prevalent on the site, with homemade wine being made on the site, a coke machine being installed and stocked with beer, and drugs such as methamphetamine used by some visitors.

Ultimately, Youth Brigade recalled in a 1982 interview:

... The manor kind of fell apart because we got too many assholes that didn't give a shit. And there wasn't any money to support the ideas. That's the most important thing — you need capital. So we split, the landlady wanted us out, too. Then the place was mysteriously burned down.

A club called Godzilla's, located in a former bowling alley in the Sun Valley section of Los Angeles, became the new hub of activity for the Stern brothers, and the venue became a mecca for punk rockers from around Southern California. With everyone working at the club, soon a small nest egg of working capital was accumulated and Better Youth Organization (BYO) was launched in 1982, as an umbrella for the promotion of punk rock shows and the production of music. Shawn and Mark Stern also formed their own label, Better Youth Organization, as part of the project.

Youth Brigade's first year of existence was as a six piece but played their first gig as a three piece on New Year's Eve 1981 at Godzilla's nightclub. They were part of the big BYO extravaganza "Youth Movement '82" at the Hollywood Palladium, where 3500 people showed up for an all Los Angeles bill in early February.

Sound & Fury (1982–1983)
In the summer of 1982, after recording three tracks for the first BYO record release Someone Got Their Head Kicked In, Youth Brigade set out in a big yellow school bus on an ambitious 30-city North American tour with fellow punk band Social Distortion. The 1984 film, Another State of Mind, chronicled the event.

After about 30 shows and several breakdowns they returned home to record their debut LP Sound & Fury with the record producer, Thom Wilson. A premature version of the LP was rushed together before the tour but pressing was stopped at 800 copies, as the band was not satisfied with the quality of the material or production. In 1983, the band returned home and decided to record a second album entitled Sound & Fury, keeping only four tracks from the original version. This was followed by a 50 date tour of North America during the summer.

Final years and Adam's departure (1984–1987)
After having secured a licensing deal for Sound & Fury in England, plans were made to tour Europe in the fall of 1984. They released a three song EP What Price? in spring 1984 and then played around 50 dates throughout the Netherlands, Germany, France, Spain, Italy, Yugoslavia, Poland, and England and were one of the first independent American bands to tour the "underground" of Europe and eastern countries. After this tour, younger brother and band bassist Adam decided to return to art school and finish his degree. The band recorded his last show in June 1985 at Fenders Ballroom in Long Beach, California and these tracks have been released on Italian and French releases as well as the Sink With Kalifornija CD collection.

Brothers Shawn and Mark continued on as "The Brigade" for about two years after the departure of Adam, giving their first interview under the new moniker in April 1986.

Royal Crown Revue (1989–1991)
Mark, Adam and younger brother Jamie Stern formed half of the original line up of the swing band Royal Crown Revue, which started in 1989.  All three Stern brothers left the band in 1991, shortly before the Youth Brigade reunion.  Royal Crown Revue continued with new members replacing the departing Stern brothers.

Reunion (1991–present)
In 1991, meeting in a bar in Hamburg, Mark and Adam expressed the desire to reform Youth Brigade for a tour and Shawn agreed. When they returned home in January 1992, they started working on new material and did a show at the Whisky A Go-Go in Hollywood, late April.

They recorded six songs in July at Westbeach Studios for their Come Again EP. In the middle of September that Youth Brigade once again packed their bags to tour Europe. The tour covered Germany, Sweden, Norway, Denmark, Switzerland, France, Spain, Italy, Czechoslovakia and Poland.

More than ten years after their debut, the band recorded Happy Hour at Westbeach Studios and released it March 1994. Soon after they added former Cadillac Tramps, U.S. Bombs, and current Social Distortion guitarist Jonny "2 Bags" Wickersham and recorded the next full length To Sell the Truth in April 1996. Produced by Steve Kravac (Less Than Jake, MXPX) and mixed by longtime friend Thom Wilson (Offspring, Bouncing Souls). In 1996, the band also contributed to the AIDS benefit album Silencio=Muerte: Red Hot + Latin produced by the Red Hot Organization along with Cuca (band).

In 1998 the band went back in the studio to record a 30-second song for the Fat Wreck Chords compilation, Short Music For Short People. The song was recorded in a friend's living room, and brought back all of the raw edged energy that had been missing in previous recordings. The raw sound went over so well, that the band decided to abandon the high production sounds and get back to basics. In mid-1999, they went in to record 6 new tracks for Volume 2 of the BYO Records Split series. The flip side of the album was recorded by Northern Californian punks Swingin Utters. The album received rave reviews, stating that this was Youth Brigade's best recording ever.

In October 2013, Brian Hanover (Hanover Saints, Union Hearts) replaced Mike Carter on guitar.

Members

Discography

Studio albums
Sound & Fury (1982)
Sound & Fury (1983)
The Dividing Line (1986) (as The Brigade)
Happy Hour (1994)
To Sell the Truth (1996)

EPs and singles
What Price Happiness? (1984)
Come Together (1986) (as The Brigade)
Come Again (EP)|Come Again (1992)
All Style No Substance (1994)

Split releases

 Epitaph / Care  (April 1986) – Reactor Records 
Youth Brigade/Screw 32 (1995)
BYO Split Series Volume II (1999)

Compilation albums
Sink With Kalifornija (1994)
Out of Print (1998)
A Best of Youth Brigade (2002)

Compilation appearances
Someone Got Their Head Kicked In! (1982)
Something To Believe In (1984)
Someone's Gonna Get Their Head To Believe In Something (1994)	
Silencio=Muerte: Red Hot + Latin (1996)
How To Start A Fight (1996)
The World Still Won't Listen - A Tribute To The Smiths (1996)
Sample This! (1997)
Dropping Food on Their Heads Is Not Enough: Benefit for RAWA (2002)
Sample This, Too (2002)
Voices in the Wilderness: A Benefit Compilation (2005)
Let Them Know: The Story of Youth Brigade and BYO Records (2009)

References

External links

Full Youth Brigade biography
BYO Records Homepage
Youth Brigade Spanish
December 2009 Interview
June 2009 Youth Brigade Interview
KILL FROM THE HEART Youth Brigade – History, Discography, Info
1984 Interview by Guillotine; Jackson Heights, NY Ragged Edge Collection @ Archive.org

Musical groups from Los Angeles
Musical groups established in 1980
Hardcore punk groups from California
BYO Records artists
Sibling musical trios
Jewish punk rock groups